The 28th Annual Gotham Independent Film Awards, presented by the Independent Filmmaker Project, were held on November 26, 2018. The nominees were announced on October 18, 2018. Actors Willem Dafoe and Rachel Weisz, director Paul Greengrass and producer Jon Kamen received tribute awards.

Winners and nominees

Film

Television

Special awards

Special Jury Award – Ensemble Performance
 The Favourite – Olivia Colman, Emma Stone, and Rachel Weisz

Made in NY Award
 Sandra Lee

Gotham Tributes
 Willem Dafoe
 Paul Greengrass
 Jon Kamen
 Rachel Weisz

References

External links
 

2018 film awards
2018